is a tiny asteroid, classified as a near-Earth object of the Aten group moving in a 1:1 mean-motion resonance with Earth. Because of that, it is in a co-orbital configuration relative to Earth.

Discovery, orbit and physical properties 

 was discovered by the Lincoln Near Earth Asteroid Research (LINEAR) system in orbit around the Sun on 20 December 2003. Its diameter is approximately 10 to 30 metres. The object is on NASA's Earth Close Approach list, and is estimated to miss Earth by 0.01 AU. It revolves around the Sun on an Earth-like, almost circular, orbit. Its orbital period of 363.846 days also is very close to the sidereal year.

Co-orbital with Earth and orbital evolution 

From approximately 1997 to 2006, the asteroid remained within  of Earth and it appeared to slowly orbit Earth. However,  is no second moon, as it is not bound to Earth. It is the first discovered member of a postulated group of coorbital objects, or quasi-satellites, which show these path characteristics. Before 1996, the asteroid had been on a so-called horseshoe orbit around the Sun, along the Earth's orbit. After 2006, it had regained such an orbit.

See also 

 Arjuna asteroid
 Natural satellite
 Quasi-satellite
 3753 Cruithne
 6Q0B44E

References

External links 
 MPEC 2003-Y76 : 2003 YN107 (Discovery MPEC)
 NASA's Near-Earth Object close approach tables
 Corkscrew Asteroid, Tony Phillips, Science@NASA, 9 June 2006.
 Horseshoe asteroids and quasi-satellites in Earth-like orbits
 
 
 

Minor planet object articles (unnumbered)
20031220